The 2006 Tonga earthquake occurred on 4 May at  with a moment magnitude of 8.0 and a maximum Mercalli intensity of VII (very strong). One injury occurred and a non-destructive tsunami was observed.

Earthquake
The National Oceanic and Atmospheric Administration's Pacific Tsunami Warning Center in Hawaii issued a warning 17 minutes after the earthquake for coastal areas around the Pacific. An hour later, the center downgraded the warning to only the region within 600 miles of the epicenter, and an hour after that, it canceled the alert. The earthquake was followed by a pair of large aftershocks the next day.

Damage
The event caused very limited damage. The previous large earthquake in Tonga, in 1977, was of a lower magnitude but resulted in more severe damage. A likely cause is that the 2006 quake generated other frequencies that only resulted in resonance in small items. In shops, cans and bottles fell from shelves.

The century-old Catholic church in Lapaha had new cracks in the tower and several stones fell down, leaving the steeple in a somewhat unstable position.
The tower of a 60-year-old church of the Free church of Tonga in Veitongo collapsed, the steeple came down and several walls cracked beyond repair.
A Korean business man jumped in panic from his second floor hotel room and was hurt in the fall. He was brought to the hospital where he had to wait a long time for any help as power was off and most staff off duty (as that day was a public holiday).
The American wharf in Nukualofa sustained cracks in addition to those caused by the 1977 earthquake.
A ship, sunk in 1949 near Toula, Vavau apparently burst open and its load of copra came floating to the ocean surface.
A landslide occurred at Hunga island in Vavau, when the ground at a steep cliff along the shore began sliding into the sea.
In Haapai, the islands closest to the epicentre, the wharf was damaged and a number of water-pipes and telephone lines were broken. Niuui hospital was damaged.

Tsunami
Since the earthquake occurred underwater, tsunami warnings were issued, but then lifted. A small tsunami was observed. Later analysis showed the earthquake to be a slab-tearing event and so less conducive to tsunami generation.

See also
List of earthquakes in 2006
List of earthquakes in Tonga

References

External links
Poster of the Tonga Earthquake of 3 May 2006 - Magnitude 7.9 – United States Geological Survey

2006 Tonga
Tonga
Tonga Earthquake, 2006
May 2006 events in Oceania
2006 disasters in Oceania